William Robert McCracken (29 January 1883 – 20 January 1979) was a Northern Irish footballer who played as a defender. He is famous for inventing the offside trap. He was a cousin of Robert McCracken who also had a career as a professional footballer.

Playing career
During his career, McCracken captained both English club Newcastle United and the Ireland national side. McCracken played for Newcastle from 1904 to 1924, helping them win three Football League titles and one FA Cup. In total he played 432 games for the Magpies, scoring eight goals.

McCracken gained sixteen international caps (including one unofficial match against Scotland in 1903, but excluding two 'Victory matches' in 1919 against the same opposition), scoring one goal. His team mates while playing for Ireland included Archie Goodall, Billy Scott, Jack Kirwan and Robert Milne. During World War I he helped to arrange two fundraising matches featuring top players and turned out for the England XI in both, facing Ireland on the second occasion.

McCracken is one of just a few players whose actions have brought changes to the Laws of the Game when, as a right full back at Newcastle, he masterminded the technique of making opposition forwards ruled "offside" when the rules stated that three defenders must be between the attacking player and the goal line. So successful was McCracken's defensive ploy that the Offside Law was changed to "two defenders" between the foremost attacker and the goal line".
Illustrious italian coach Vittorio Pozzo, who had
personally seen him play, praised much McCracken, in his own words, the master of fuori-giuoco (offside).
According to Pozzo he even wrote a booklet to explain
his "offside trick".

Managerial career
After leaving Newcastle he went on to become Hull City manager in 1923, and he took them to the FA Cup semi-final in 1930. He left the club a year later.

He later had a short term in charge of Gateshead, before managing Millwall from 1933 to 1936. He went on to manage the now defunct Aldershot, and later returned to Newcastle as a scout. In the 1970s, with McCracken in his 90s, he was scouting for Watford.

Honours

As a player
Distillery
Irish Football League champion: 1902–03
 Irish Cup winner: 1903
Runner-up: 1902

Newcastle United
Football League champion: 1904–05, 1906–07, 1908–09
 FA Cup winner: 1910
Runner-up: 1908, 1911

References

1883 births
1979 deaths
Association footballers from Belfast
Newcastle United F.C. players
Irish association footballers (before 1923)
Pre-1950 IFA international footballers
Football managers from Northern Ireland
English Football League players
English Football League managers
Lisburn Distillery F.C. players
Irish League representative players
NIFL Premiership players
Hull City A.F.C. managers
Gateshead A.F.C. managers
Millwall F.C. managers
Aldershot F.C. managers
Association football defenders
Association football scouts
Newcastle United F.C. non-playing staff
Watford F.C. non-playing staff
Ireland (IFA) wartime international footballers
FA Cup Final players